The National Lighthouse Museum is a lighthouse museum in Pohang, North Gyeongsang Province, South Korea.

History
The museum was opened in 1985.

References

External links
 

1985 establishments in South Korea
Museums in North Gyeongsang Province
Pohang
Lighthouse museums